The Mississippi Delta Chinese are a small community of Chinese Americans that has lived in the Mississippi Delta region since the late 19th century.  A related population of Chinese Americans lives across the Mississippi River in the Arkansas Delta and the nearby city of Memphis, Tennessee.

History 

The earliest Chinese settlers in the Mississippi Delta were laborers recruited by cotton planters to supplement the recently emancipated African freedmen during  Reconstruction. Like other early Chinese Americans, the first Chinese immigrants were peasants and merchants from the Sze Yap region of Guangdong province in Southern China. All of them were single and married men who worked in Mississippi and sent most of their income back to their families in China. As they were neither black nor white, the Chinese were often classified as "colored" in early government records.  

By the end of the 1870s, the Chinese had abandoned the plantations and began opening small family-owned grocery stores in the many small towns of the Delta. Chinese families began moving to the Delta in the early 1900s, and most modern Mississippi Delta Chinese are the descendants of Chinese who arrived in Mississippi during this time. Until the end of the 1900s, Chinese-owned groceries could be found in every Delta city and town, serving both white and black customers. Chinese children were originally segregated from the white public schools, and segregated Chinese schools were built for them in  Greenville and  Cleveland. However, these schools were closed and Chinese children were allowed to attend both white schools and white colleges after the Second World War.

The population of the Mississippi Delta Chinese exploded after war. Many young Chinese men from the Mississippi Delta served as soldiers during the Second World War, and many women from China married these soldiers and settled in the Delta as war brides after the war. By the 1970s there were as many as 3,000 Americans of Chinese descent living in the Delta, especially American-born Chinese children who were raised in the Delta. For decades the Mississippi Delta Chinese community was one of the largest Chinese American communities in the American South, but since then, many families have moved to larger cities in Texas, the West Coast, and the Northeast. Most of the historic Chinese groceries have already closed, and only a few families remain in the Delta.

Ethnic identity 

Arriving into a strictly segregated society with whites on top and blacks on the bottom, the Chinese carved out their own unique niche in a primarily biracial society. Neither black nor white, they were initially classified as "non-white" and later as simply "Chinese". While not seen as being on the same social status as whites neither were they seen on the same level as blacks despite often living in black neighborhoods and serving mostly black clients and customers. The Chinese were middlemen between blacks and whites, often providing a needed contact point in a segregated society. The Chinese initially attended separate Chinese schools separate from both blacks and whites although in later decades before segregation officially was outlawed, they often attended schools with white students. In many cases they sought to identify with white society as much as they could due to whites having the highest status in Jim Crow society. Many Chinese men, for the lack of Chinese women to marry, married Black women.

Notable people 

 Sam Chu Lin, journalist and news anchor 
 Martin F. Jue, entrepreneur and inventor 
 Josephine Jue, NASA computer scientist
 Only Won, Producer Far East Deep South

References

Further reading  
 Oral Histories, Chinese Grocers. Southern Foodways Alliance (2010). 
 Chinese Oral Histories. Delta State University. 
 
  - From the Korea Information Science Society (KISS) - Profile
  - Read online

 Media

External links 
 The Delta Chinese - Project by Andrew Kung and Emmanuel Hahn

Chinese-American culture
History of Mississippi
Ethnic groups in Mississippi